Trachyandra peculiaris is a species of plant which is endemic to Namibia.  It is threatened by habitat loss.

References

Flora of Namibia
peculiaris
Vulnerable plants
Taxonomy articles created by Polbot
Taxa named by Kurt Dinter